Kachalin is a rural locality (a khutor) and the administrative center of Kachalinskoye Rural Settlement, Surovikinsky District, Volgograd Oblast, Russia. The population was 422 as of 2010. There are 6 streets.

Geography 
Kachalin is located on the Liska River, 38 km northeast of Surovikino (the district's administrative centre) by road. Ostrov is the nearest rural locality.

References 

Rural localities in Surovikinsky District